Lorenzo "Larry" Gacilo Gadon (born March 1, 1958) is a Filipino lawyer. He ran for a senatorial seat in 2016, 2019 and 2022 election under UniTeam senatorial slate of Bongbong Marcos, all of which were unsuccessful. He is famously known on social media due to his use of vulgar language and strong stance against liberals and communists.

Early life
Gadon was born on March 1, 1958, in Roxas, Oriental Mindoro to Sulpicio Gadon and Lazarita Gacilo. He obtained his Bachelor of Science in Commerce and Bachelor of Law both from the Far Eastern University (FEU).

Gadon was part of the legal team and adviser of former President Gloria Macapagal Arroyo.

Political career

Senate bid
A supporter of former President Ferdinand Marcos, Gadon ran for the position of senator in the 2016 elections under the Kilusang Bagong Lipunan (KBL) but lost.

In 2019, he ran again for senator but lost. His campaign slogan is "Hindi tayo bobo.".

Gadon ran again for Senator in 2022. He used his time on the stage to talk about his plans to amend the 1987 Constitution. While he criticized the administrations of former Presidents Corazon Aquino and Benigno Aquino III, he commended the presidencies of Marcos, Gloria Macapagal Arroyo and Rodrigo Duterte. He was named to the senatorial slate of UniTeam Alliance. However, he lost for the third time.

As a Marcos loyalist, he does not believe in the alleged ill-gotten wealth of the Marcos family and is for the state burial of Ferdinand Marcos. He is against Bangsamoro Basic Law (BBL) and same-sex marriage but is for the Freedom of Information (FOI) Bill. Gadon is also an anti-communist and opposed rebel groups such as Communist Party of the Philippines (CPP), New People's Army (NPA), and The National Democratic Front of the Philippines (NDF).

Filed impeachment complaints
Gadon filed an impeachment complaint against then Supreme Court Chief Justice  Maria Lourdes Sereno which led to her ouster in May 2018. He also sought to oust Associate Justice Marvic Leonen but failed.

Controversies

At least four disbarment cases were filed against Gadon in 2018 for cursing and flashing his middle finger during a Baguio protest related to the Sereno case. During the protest, Gadon referred to Sereno's supporters as "mga bobo" (lit. "idiots") and raised his middle finger at them. The video, as recorded by various media channels, went viral on Philippine social media and was used in memes and parody songs.

The Supreme Court of the Philippines imposed Gadon with a three-month suspension in 2019 for using “offensive” language toward a doctor as it was a violation of the Code of Professional Responsibility of Lawyers.

In mid-August 2020, during the COVID-19 pandemic, he was spotted in a public gathering while handing out snacks and a face mask to a hospital in Caloocan wearing face shield with a face mask plastered and taped over it. He stated that is just "for the show" since the government mandated the mandatory use of face masks in public.  He firmly believed that COVID-19 is fake and the wearing of a mask is ineffective. He was then warned of a possible arrest by both the DOH and PNP for not following government protocols against the mitigation of the virus.

References

External links 

 Official website of Larry Gadon
 Instagram page
 YouTube channel

1958 births
Living people
Far Eastern University alumni
Far-right politics in Asia
Kilusang Bagong Lipunan politicians
People convicted of speech crimes
Filipino anti-communists
Tagalog people
21st-century Filipino politicians
Politicians from Oriental Mindoro
People from Quezon City
20th-century Filipino lawyers